Per Olsen may refer to:

 Per Olsen (cross-country skier) (1932–2013), Norwegian cross country skier
 Per Olsen (swimmer) (born 1934), Norwegian swimmer
 Per Arne Olsen (born 1961), Norwegian politician
 Per Erling Olsen (born 1958), Norwegian javelin thrower
 Per Olaf Olsen (1871–1919), Norwegian sports shooter
 Per Skjerwen Olsen (born 1939), Norwegian ice hockey player and football player